A 1953 statue of George S. Patton by James Earle Fraser (sometimes called General George Smith Patton, Jr.) is installed along Boston's Charles River Esplanade, in the U.S. state of Massachusetts.

Description and history
The bronze sculpture measures approximately 8 x 3 x 3 ft., and rests on a pink granite base that measures approximately 4 x 10 x 7 ft. It commemorates the general's June 7, 1945 address delivered from the Hatch Memorial Shell before a crowd of 20,000.

The work was surveyed as part of the Smithsonian Institution's "Save Outdoor Sculpture!" program in 1997.

See also

 1953 in art

References

External links
 

1953 establishments in Massachusetts
1953 sculptures
Bronze sculptures in Massachusetts
Charles River Esplanade
George S. Patton
Granite sculptures in Massachusetts
Monuments and memorials in Boston
Outdoor sculptures in Boston
Sculptures of men in Massachusetts
Statues in Boston